Britta Haßelmann (born 10 December 1961) is a German politician of Alliance 90/The Greens who has been serving as co-chair of the Green Party’s parliamentary group in the Bundestag since 2021, alongside Katharina Dröge. From 2013 until 2021, she was the group’s first manager. She has been a member of the Bundestag since 2005.

Early life and career
Haßelmann was born in Straelen and later studied social work at the University of Bielefeld.

Political career

Early beginnings
Haßelmann became a member of the Green Party in 1994. From 2000 until 2006, she served – alongside Frithjof Schmidt – as co-chair of the Green Party in North Rhine-Westphalia, the party's largest chapter. During that period, her party was in a coalition government with the Social Democratic Party under Minister-President Wolfgang Clement.

Member of the German Parliament, 2005–present
Haßelmann has been a member of the German Bundestag since the 2005 federal election, representing Bielefeld. From 2005 until 2017, she served on the Finance Committee. In 2009, she also joined the Council of Elders, which – among other duties – determines daily legislative agenda items and assigns committee chairpersons based on party representation.

Within her parliamentary group, Haßelmann served as Chief Whip from 2013 until 2021, under the leadership of the group's co-chairs Katrin Göring-Eckardt and Anton Hofreiter. In the – unsuccessful – negotiations to form a coalition government with the Christian Democrats – both the Christian Democratic Union (CDU) and the Christian Social Union in Bavaria (CSU) – and the Free Democratic Party following the 2017 elections, she was part of her party's delegation.

From 2018, Haßelmann was part of a cross-party working group on a reform of Germany's electoral system, chaired by Wolfgang Schäuble.

Other activities
 German National Committee for UNICEF, Member of the Board (since 2020)
 Heinrich Böll Foundation, Member of the Supervisory Board
 Terre des Femmes, Member

References

External links 
 

1961 births
Living people
Bielefeld University alumni
Members of the Bundestag for North Rhine-Westphalia
Members of the Bundestag 2021–2025
Members of the Bundestag 2017–2021
Members of the Bundestag 2013–2017
Members of the Bundestag 2009–2013
Members of the Bundestag 2005–2009
Members of the Bundestag for Alliance 90/The Greens